In probability theory and mathematical physics, a random matrix is a matrix-valued random variable—that is, a matrix in which some or all elements are random variables. Many important properties of physical systems can be represented mathematically as matrix problems. For example, the thermal conductivity of a lattice can be computed from the dynamical matrix of the particle-particle interactions within the lattice.

Applications

Physics

In nuclear physics, random matrices were introduced by Eugene Wigner to model the nuclei of heavy atoms. Wigner postulated that the spacings between the lines in the spectrum of a heavy atom nucleus should resemble the spacings between the eigenvalues of a random matrix, and should depend only on the symmetry class of the underlying evolution. In solid-state physics, random matrices model the behaviour of large disordered Hamiltonians in the mean-field approximation.

In quantum chaos, the Bohigas–Giannoni–Schmit (BGS) conjecture asserts that the spectral statistics of quantum systems whose classical counterparts exhibit chaotic behaviour are described by random matrix theory.

In quantum optics, transformations described by random unitary matrices are crucial for demonstrating the advantage of quantum over classical computation (see, e.g., the boson sampling model). Moreover, such random unitary transformations can be directly implemented in an optical circuit, by mapping their parameters to optical circuit components (that is beam splitters and phase shifters).

Random matrix theory has also found applications to the chiral Dirac operator in quantum chromodynamics, quantum gravity in two dimensions, mesoscopic physics, spin-transfer torque, the fractional quantum Hall effect, Anderson localization, quantum dots, and superconductors

Mathematical statistics and numerical analysis

In multivariate statistics, random matrices were introduced by John Wishart, who sought to estimate covariance matrices of large samples.  Chernoff-, Bernstein-, and Hoeffding-type inequalities can typically be strengthened when applied to the maximal eigenvalue of a finite sum of random Hermitian matrices.  

In numerical analysis, random matrices have been used since the work of John von Neumann and Herman Goldstine to describe computation errors in operations such as matrix multiplication. Although random entries are traditional "generic" inputs to an algorithm, the concentration of measure associated with random matrix distributions implies that random matrices will not test large portions of an algorithm's input space.

Number theory

In number theory, the distribution of zeros of the Riemann zeta function (and other L-functions) is modeled by the distribution of eigenvalues of certain random matrices. The connection was first discovered by Hugh Montgomery and Freeman J. Dyson. It is connected to the Hilbert–Pólya conjecture.

Theoretical neuroscience

In the field of theoretical neuroscience, random matrices are increasingly used to model the network of synaptic connections between neurons in the brain.  Dynamical models of neuronal networks with random connectivity matrix were shown to exhibit a phase transition to chaos when the variance of the synaptic weights crosses a critical value, at the limit of infinite system size.  Results on random matrices have also shown that the dynamics of random-matrix models are insensitive to mean connection strength.  Instead, the stability of fluctuations depends on connection strength variation and time to synchrony depends on network topology.

Optimal control

In optimal control theory, the evolution of n state variables through time depends at any time on their own values and on the values of k control variables. With linear evolution, matrices of coefficients appear in the state equation (equation of evolution). In some problems the values of the parameters in these matrices are not known with certainty, in which case there are random matrices in the state equation and the problem is known as one of stochastic control. A key result in the case of linear-quadratic control with stochastic matrices is that the certainty equivalence principle does not apply: while in the absence of multiplier uncertainty (that is, with only additive uncertainty) the optimal policy with a quadratic loss function coincides with what would be decided if the uncertainty were ignored, the optimal policy may differ if the state equation contains random coefficients.

Computational mechanics

In computational mechanics, epistemic uncertainties underlying the lack of knowledge about the physics of the modeled system give rise to mathematical operators associated with the computational model, which are deficient in a certain sense. Such operators lack certain properties linked to unmodeled physics. When such operators are discretized to perform computational simulations, their accuracy is limited by the missing physics. To compensate for this deficiency of the mathematical operator, it is not enough to make the model parameters random, it is necessary to consider a mathematical operator that is random and can thus generate families of computational models in the hope that one of these captures the missing physics. Random matrices have been used in this sense, with applications in vibroacoustics, wave propagations, materials science, fluid mechanics, heat transfer, etc.

Gaussian ensembles
The most-commonly studied random matrix distributions are the Gaussian ensembles.

The Gaussian unitary ensemble  is described by the Gaussian measure with density

on the space of  Hermitian matrices . Here
 is a normalization constant, chosen so that the integral of the density is equal to one. The term unitary refers to the fact that the distribution is invariant under unitary conjugation. The Gaussian unitary ensemble models Hamiltonians lacking time-reversal symmetry.

The Gaussian orthogonal ensemble  is described by the Gaussian measure with density

on the space of n × n real symmetric matrices H = (Hij). Its distribution is invariant under orthogonal conjugation, and it models Hamiltonians with time-reversal symmetry.

The Gaussian symplectic ensemble  is described by the Gaussian measure with density

on the space of n × n Hermitian quaternionic matrices, e.g. symmetric square matrices composed of quaternions, . Its distribution is invariant under conjugation by the symplectic group, and it models Hamiltonians with time-reversal symmetry but no rotational symmetry.

The Gaussian ensembles GOE, GUE and GSE are often denoted by their Dyson index, β = 1 for GOE, β = 2 for GUE, and β = 4 for GSE. This index counts the number of real components per matrix element. The ensembles as defined here have Gaussian distributed matrix elements with mean ⟨Hij⟩ = 0, and two-point correlations given by

from which all higher correlations follow by Isserlis' theorem.

The joint probability density for the eigenvalues  of GUE/GOE/GSE is given by

where Zβ,n is a normalization constant which can be explicitly computed, see Selberg integral. In the case of GUE (β = 2), the formula (1) describes a determinantal point process. Eigenvalues repel as the joint probability density has a zero (of th order) for coinciding eigenvalues .

For the distribution of the largest eigenvalue for GOE, GUE and Wishart matrices of finite dimensions, see.

Distribution of level spacings

From the ordered sequence of eigenvalues , one defines the normalized spacings , where  is the mean spacing. The probability distribution of spacings is approximately given by,

for the orthogonal ensemble GOE ,

for the unitary ensemble GUE , and                                  

for the symplectic ensemble GSE .

The numerical constants are such that  is normalized:

and the mean spacing is,

Generalizations

Wigner matrices are random Hermitian matrices  such that the entries

above the main diagonal are independent random variables with zero mean and have identical second moments.

Invariant matrix ensembles are random Hermitian matrices with density on the space of real symmetric/Hermitian/quaternionic Hermitian matrices, which is of the form  where the function  is called the potential.

The Gaussian ensembles are the only common special cases of these two classes of random matrices.

Spectral theory of random matrices

The spectral theory of random matrices studies the distribution of the eigenvalues as the size of the matrix goes to infinity.

Global regime
In the global regime, one is interested in the distribution of linear statistics of the form .

Empirical spectral measure

The cumulative distribution function of the limiting measure is called the integrated density of states and is denoted N(λ). If the integrated density of states is differentiable, its derivative is called the density of states and is denoted ρ(λ).

The limit of the empirical spectral measure for Wigner matrices was described by Eugene Wigner; see Wigner semicircle distribution and Wigner surmise. As far as sample covariance matrices are concerned, a theory was developed by Marčenko and Pastur.

The limit of the empirical spectral measure of invariant matrix ensembles is described by a certain integral equation which arises from potential theory.

Fluctuations

For the linear statistics , one is also interested in the fluctuations about ∫ f(λ) dN(λ). For many classes of random matrices, a central limit theorem of the form

is known.

The variational problem for the unitary ensembles 
Consider the measure

where  is the potential of the ensemble and let  be the empirical spectral measure.

the probability measure is now of the form

where  is the above functional inside the squared brackets.

Let now

be the space of one-dimensional probability measures and consider the minimizer

For  there exists a unique euilibrium measure  through the Euler-Lagrange variational conditions for some real constant 

where  is the support of the measure and
.
The equilibrium measure  has the following Radon–Nikodym density

Local regime
In the local regime, one is interested in the spacings between eigenvalues, and, more generally, in the joint distribution of eigenvalues in an interval of length of order 1/n. One distinguishes between bulk statistics, pertaining to intervals inside the support of the limiting spectral measure, and edge statistics, pertaining to intervals near the boundary of the support.

Bulk statistics
Then consider the point process

where  are the eigenvalues of the random matrix.

(the sine kernel).

Rigorous proofs of universality are known for invariant matrix ensembles and Wigner matrices.

Edge statistics

Correlation functions 

The joint probability density of the eigenvalues of  random Hermitian matrices , with partition functions of the form

where

The -point correlation functions (or marginal distributions) 
are defined as

which are skew symmetric functions of their variables. 
In particular, the one-point correlation function, or density of states, is 

Its integral over a Borel set  gives the expected number of eigenvalues contained in :

The following result expresses these correlation functions as determinants of the matrices formed from evaluating the appropriate integral kernel at the pairs  of points appearing within the correlator.

Theorem [Dyson-Mehta] 
For any  ,  the -point correlation function  can be written as a determinant

where  is the th Christoffel-Darboux kernel

 
where  is a complete sequence of monic polynomials, of the degrees indicated, satisfying the orthogonilty conditions

Other classes of random matrices

Wishart matrices

Wishart matrices are n × n random matrices of the form , where X is an n × m random matrix (m ≥ n) with independent entries, and X* is its conjugate transpose. In the important special case considered by Wishart, the entries of X are identically distributed Gaussian random variables (either real or complex).

The limit of the empirical spectral measure of Wishart matrices was found by Vladimir Marchenko and Leonid Pastur.

Random unitary matrices

Non-Hermitian random matrices

References

Books

Survey articles

Historic works

Footnotes

External links
 
 

Algebra of random variables
 
Mathematical physics